The 1988 San Diego mayoral election was held on June 7, 1988 to elect the mayor for San Diego. Incumbent mayor Maureen O'Connor stood for reelection.

Municipal elections in California are officially non-partisan, though some candidates do receive funding and support from various political parties. The non-partisan primary was held June 7, 1988. Since the incumbent O'Connor received a majority of the primary votes, she was reelected outright with no need for a runoff.

Candidates
Maureen O'Connor, Mayor of San Diego
Floyd Morrow, former member of the San Diego City Council and mayoral candidate in 1986
Charles Ulmshneider, newspaper distributor
John Kelley, semi-retired public relations man, bible distributor, and perennial candidate
Rose Lynne, retired teacher and perennial candidate

Campaign
Incumbent mayor Maureen O'Connor was seen as the favorite going into the election. Former City Council member Floyd Morrow was considered her chief challenger, though he consistently polled well short of O'Connor. Morrow struggled to gain attention in the race, with O'Connor refusing to attend candidate forums where he might appear. On June 7, 1988, O'Connor received the majority of the votes and was re-elected mayor.

Primary election results

General election
Because O'Connor won a majority of the votes in the March primary, there was no need for a runoff in the November general election.

References

1988
1988 California elections
1988 United States mayoral elections
1980s in San Diego
June 1988 events in the United States